Nissan Cup was an ice hockey tournament for men's national teams, which was played in Switzerland between 1988-1994. Originally played in November, the tournament was later moved to February, and finally moved back to November.

Tournaments

References 

1988 establishments in Switzerland
1994 disestablishments in Switzerland
International ice hockey competitions hosted by Switzerland
February sporting events
November sporting events
Recurring sporting events established in 1988